The Elements of Life World Tour was a Tiësto tour in support of his album Elements of Life.

The concept behind his latest album Elements of Life also formed the basis for his global 'Elements of Life World Tour'. The show featured state-of-the-art special effects, moving water systems synchronized with the music and high-definition video screens. 3 trucks were needed to transport this set-up across the world. The tour was captured in the 'Elements of Life World Tour DVD'.

South and Latin America brought some of the biggest crowds on his January and February South American leg of the tour. On January 7, Tiesto played to a crowd of 200,000 people in the streets of Ipanema Beach in Rio de Janeiro. On February 16, 2008 he played in India at the Gachibowli Stadium, Hyderabad, which was his first show in South Asia.

Notable events

Terrorist threat
In late May 2007 the international DJ scene was in a state of alarm after a Lebanese site, Ya Libnan, announced that Dutch DJ Tiësto would be targeted by the radical Islamist group Fatah al-Islam. There were allegedly plans to kill DJ Tiësto during his DJ set in Byblos on Monday July 2 at the Eddé Sands Hotel & Resort. This announcement was later retracted as spurious and based on rumours. Tiësto completed the Byblos gig which turned out to be a huge success and according to Ya Libnan it has "officially become the biggest event in Lebanon's history" breaking the venue's previous record of 16,000 by several thousand – at 2 a.m. the Eddé Sands beach and the neighbouring beach had reached maximum capacity and thousands had to be turned away having to watch from nearby roads and surrounding areas, at this party 18,000 people bought the tickets to watch the concert. In the meantime 23,000 people were outside the zone hearing and dancing on the streets, the people were standing at the last place that the sound can be heard and dancing on the new album Elements Of Life his newest success.

Bahrain incident
On July 4, 2007, Tiësto failed to show up at his scheduled Elements of Life tour concert in Bahrain's capital Manama. Without prior warning, the DJ left a crowd of over 3000 fans waiting until the closing hours. Ticket prices went up to $250, and fans from across the region flew in to Bahrain just to attend the concert. The concert was clearly scheduled on his website, and tickets were still being sold until the last moment by local organizers Prime Time Entertainment and promoter Ayman Al Hamad. Apparently, Tiësto waited until the final hours to get paid in full by the organizers prior to his performance, but according to Tiësto himself they never did. Shortly before closing moments, the crowd started rioting demanding Tiësto's appearance, which forced the local police to intervene. On July 6 Tiësto provided an explanation of what had happened on his website:

Later, promoter Ayman Al Hamad told Bahrain's Gulf Daily News newspaper that Tiësto was very stupid for the statements he provided on his website, and that he believes that the DJ refused to perform because he was expecting more than 3000 fans to show up at his debut in Bahrain. Ayman also said that the DJ was offered the full payment in parts of different currencies, but refused to receive part of the payment in Bahraini Dinar because Tiësto was not willing to recognize it as a valid currency. Al Hamad strongly refuses Tiësto claim that there was nobody to transport him from his hotel to the venue: "Even if I didn't have a car for him any of the fans would be happy to offer one of theirs." He has announced that legal action will be taken against Tiësto and is also urging witnesses who took photographs or videos of the melee to come forward to assist the ongoing investigation into what did in fact take place. According to the news article Prime Time Entertainment had paid Tiësto 18,000 euros in advance to cover his private jet expenses.

Winnipeg bomb threat
On August 23, 2007, during the Winnipeg stop on Tiësto's Elements of Life tour concert in Manitoba's capital Winnipeg, a bomb threat was called in to local authorities, prompting an immediate shut down of the concert in the middle of Tiësto's set. Amid fears that a riot would ensue, the Winnipeg Police Department dispatched over 20 cruisers from around the city to control the crowd. The crowd did not turn violent despite fears they would and the party continued outside when local buskers began to play. The building was searched and cleared and Tiësto resumed his set around 1 am.

Tour dates

See also
 Elements of Life
 Elements of Life World Tour (DVD)
 Elements of Life: Remixed

References

External links

2007 concert tours
2008 concert tours
Tiësto concert tours

es:Elements of Life#Elements of Life World Tour 2007-2008